Laikipia Air Base  is a Kenya Air Force base located approximately  west-northwest of Nanyuki, Kenya.

Laikipia AB was established in 1974 as Nanyuki Air Base and later renamed for the county in which it is located.

History
On 25 February 1974, Nanyuki Air Base was opened by the Kenya Air Force (KAF) as its primary airfield for fighter aircraft.  In June 1974, the KAF's fleet of BAC Strikemaster aircraft were transferred from RAF Eastleigh (later named KAF Eastleigh) to Nanyuki Air Base.  Also in 1974, the KAF purchased six Hawker Hunter combat jets from the Royal Air Force and located them at Nanyuki Air Base (which had since its opening been renamed KAF Nanyuki).  In 1978, the Northrop F-5 Freedom Fighter was introduced to the KAF and also based at Nanyuki, and the following year, Nanyuki became the home of the KAF's fleet of Hawker Siddeley Hawk flight training jets.

After the a failed coup by a group of KAF officers on 1 August 1982, the Kenya Air Force was disbanded and placed under the control of the Kenyan Army.  During this period, KAF Eastleigh was renamed Moi Air Base and KAF Nanyuki was renamed Laikipia Air Base (LAB).

In August 2014, gunmen drove into one of the airfield's gate and opened fire.  One soldier was injured.

British presence

In 2015, the UK began an infrastructure project to relocate the HQ for its British Army training unit in Kenya, named the British Army Training Unit Kenya (BATUK), to Laikipia Air Base. The HQ is located within an area designated Laikipia Air Base East (LAB(E)). Previously, it was located on land leased from the Nanyuki Agricultural Society, which had to be vacated every year to make way for an agricultural show. LAB(E) now provides permanent facilities on land leased directly from the Kenyan government. BATUK is used to train around 10,000 British troops per year and has 300 permanent personnel.

References

Airports in Kenya
Military airbases
Military of Kenya
Laikipia County